Bucculatrix bicristata is a species of moth in the family Bucculatricidae. The species was first described in 1963 by Annette Frances Braun. It is found in North America, where it has been recorded from Florida.

The wingspan is 14 mm. Adults have been recorded on wing in May.

References

Natural History Museum Lepidoptera generic names catalog

Bucculatricidae
Moths described in 1963
Moths of North America
Taxa named by Annette Frances Braun